Çerkeş is a town in Çankırı Province in the Central Anatolia region of Turkey. It is the seat of Çerkeş District. Its population is 9,634 (2021).

References

External links
 Municipality's official website 

Populated places in Çankırı Province
Çerkeş District
Towns in Turkey